ADFC may refer to
 Allgemeiner Deutscher Fahrrad-Club, German cyclists club
 Australian Defence Force Cadets, Australian youth development organization